Rosie Holt is a British actor, comedian and satirist. She is best known for her popular satirical videos, Woman Who..., released on her Twitter feed, that she first started to create during the 2020 COVID-19 lockdown. The Guardian newspaper noted her "strong line in parodies of the [type of] political speech that veers into drivel."

Career
Holt jointly wrote and performed as part of the double act "Holt and Talbot", alongside Christian Talbot, at the Edinburgh Fringe in both 2017 and 2018. Holt is one of a number of satirists who subsequently found a popular online niche for her art during the COVID-19 pandemic.

Television 
 2019 Bounty (pilot), Jess, Channel 4
 2021 The Russell Howard Hour, Margaret/Jenny, Avalon/Sky

Theatre 
 2004 Hamlet, Ophelia, University of Manchester
 2005 Prometheus Bound, Chorus, Sound Theatre
 2005 Myth Propaganda and Destruction, Marguerite, Contact Theatre
 2005 Equus, Jill, University of Manchester
 2006 Les Liaisons Dangereuses, Cecile, University of Manchester
 2008 The Learned Ladies, Philamente, LAMDA
 2008 The Eumenides, Chorus, LAMDA
 2008 The Changeling, Beatrice, LAMDA
 2008 Plenty, Susan, LAMDA
 2008 King John, Blanche, LAMDA
 2009 Three Sisters, Irina, LAMDA
 2009 Meat Money Jesus, Patience, LAMDA
 2009 A Time To Keep, Princess Augusta/Henrietta/Meg/Rose, LAMDA
 2009 A Midsummer Night's Dream, Hermia, LAMDA
 2010 The Libertine, Jane, LAMDA
 2010 Lashings Of Whipped Cream, Trixie, The Nursery Festival
 2010 DNA, Leah, LAMDA
 2011 Wuthering Heights, Catherine Earnshaw, Aberystwyth Arts Centre, National Tour
 2011 Romeo and Juliet, Juliet, New Triad Theatre, European Tour
 2015 Treasure Island, Jim /Gemima, Creation Theatre
 2019 The Crown Dual, HRH Queen Elizabeth II, Edinburgh Festival
 2019 The Crown Dual, HRH Queen Elizabeth II, Wiltons Music Hall

Comedy 
 2014 Fall Girl, Writer / Performer, Canal Cafe Theatre
 2014 Fall Girl, Writer / Performer, Gilded Balloon
 2017 Holt & Talbot Can't Stand The Sight Of Each Other, Writer / Performer, Edinburgh Fringe 
 2018 Some Like It Holt, Writer / Performer, Edinburgh Fringe
 2018 Mansplaining Feminism, Writer / Performer, Bath Komedia
 2018 Mansplaining Feminism, Writer / Performer, Edinburgh Fringe
 2020 Webidate, Writer / Performer, Web Series
 2021 Woman Who..., Writer / Performer, Twitter
 2022 The Woman's Hour, Writer / Performer, Edinburgh Fringe

Radio
She appeared on BBC Radio 4's The Museum of Curiosity in February 2023. Her hypothetical donation to this imaginary museum was "The unwritten second half of Coleridge's Kubla Khan.

Online work 
In August 2013, Holt's entry in The Sitcom Trials, 'Never Better', was selected as winner. In October 2021, Holt was interviewed about her success online as part of a Backstage magazine article. She also appeared in an online educational workshop aimed at Buckinghamshire schools, using the short-form comedic video as an example of a new method of communication.

In August 2021, Holt was featured in a newspaper story in the Daily Mirror after the dating app Hinge suggested that her 'most compatible match' would be her own brother Charlie. Her tweet relaying the story attracted 23,000 likes within two days.

January 2022 was a period of intense political controversy about an allegedly unlawful party that had been held in Downing Street during the 2020 COVID-19 lockdown (when parties had been prohibited), and an official report was eagerly awaited from the Cabinet Office Second Permanent Secretary, Sue Gray. In a satirical video sketch released to Twitter, Holt played the part of a Tory MP being asked by an interviewer whether she had or had not attended a Downing Street party. The video was created by splicing the interviewee's responses with real footage of questions from a Sky News reporter to Boris Johnson in which he had dodged questions about whether he had gone to the party. Her response – that until Sue Gray completes her report “your guess is as good as mine: I don’t know whether I attended the party” – generated an outraged response from some viewers who missed the satire and who thought that the interviewee was a real MP.

Personal life 
Holt originates from Somerset, UK.

References

External links

British actresses
British comedy writers
Year of birth missing (living people)
Living people
People from Somerset
British comedians